Robert Steele was Commissioner and President Pro Tempore for the 2nd district of Cook County, Illinois, covering the West Side of Chicago.
As Cook County Board Commissioner, Steele voted to uphold a 1.5% 2008 Cook County sales tax increase, remaining the highest in the nation which led the Chicago Tribune to encourage voters to vote against him in the 2010 elections.

Until his death in 2017, Steele was chairman of board of Frazier Preparatory Academy.

Early life 
He was born in Cook County Hospital, Chicago, Illinois on June 29, 1961, to Robert and Bobbie L. Steele. His mother had previously been both Cook County Commissioner and Board President. Steele is a graduate of the Morgan State University in Maryland.

Death 
Steele died on June 19, 2017, due to complications related to diabetes.

References

External links
Cook County Board of Commissioners profile 

Members of the Cook County Board of Commissioners
Politicians from Chicago
Morgan State University alumni
Politicians from Cook County, Illinois
1961 births
2017 deaths